Sealed with a Kiss (Chinese: 吻我吧，住家男) is a Singaporean romance drama produced and telecast on MediaCorp Channel 8. The drama began production in April 2015 and began its run from 27 August 2015. The show aired at 9pm on weekdays and had a repeat telecast at 8am the following day. The series stars Rebecca Lim, Elvin Ng, Zhang Zhenhuan and Carrie Wong as the main casts of the series.

Plot
Du Junning (Rebecca Lim), is a successful real estate agent. She is well known for knowing how to sweet-talk not only her clients, as well as her superior and colleagues. However, those words are not what will truly comes from her heart. One day, she realized that her life has turned upside down after an accidental kiss with Zhu Jianan - where she could only speak the truth. She started offending people all around her by being blunt and straightforward, which result in the loss of job, relationship, kinship and even friendship. Her father avoided her, her best friend Zhenzhen fell out with her and she drove her boyfriend away.

Zhu Jianan (Elvin Ng), is a man who is a jinx to the people around him. He has a crush on Du Junning and enjoys watching romantic Korean dramas, and often visualized her and himself as the leads, having an extremely romantic story plot. When he had an accidental kiss with Du Junning, he became a lucky star - good things kept coming towards him such as winning the lucky draw and became a famous designer overnight. However, his luck has attracted all his relatives whom disagreed to take Jianan in when he was much younger, trying to gain some benefits from him.

Zheng Danle (Zhang Zhenhuan), nicknamed Cool Man, is Jianan's only best friend and the only one not affected by his bad luck. On the outside, he doesn't seemed to be bothered about what's going on around him - but in the inside, he actually longed for a family love, which he envies the kinship between Jianan and Chen Xinshan. He's used to hiding his inner-self, which result in him not knowing how to express his love for Tian Zhenzhen.

Tian Zhenzhen (Carrie Wong), believes that love conquers everything. Her boyfriend often cheats on her - for that she fear that he might leave her, so she chose to turn a blind eye. She fell out with Junning for making Shiqian break up with her - not knowing that it's for her own good. A new affection between her and Danle is soon formed after knowing Shiqian's real intention.

After the breakup, Zhenzhen started feeling the same as Danle after he confess and they soon became a couple - knowing how well-protected she is when with Danle. On the other hand, knowing that the kiss between Junning and Jianan changed their lives upside down, she went to confront Jianan - where he willingly wants to kiss Junning back so that she can have her life back, regardless the fact that he will become a jinx to others again. Will they return to their original state if Junning and Jianan kiss?

Cast

Main cast

Other cast

Trivia
 This is the first time that Elvin Ng and Rebecca Lim paired together.
 Snippets of the next episode are shown during the ending credits of each episode. This is the tenth series where News Tonight commentaries are not announced.
 Charles Lee's second Singaporean drama after 118.
The series was repeated at 8am. 
The series is pre-empted on 11 Sep 2015 to air the live coverage of the results of the Singaporean general election 2015.
The Series repeat its telecast on weekday 5.30pm in Feb 2016 succeeding Life Is Beautiful
This Series repeat its telecast succeeding It Takes Two on 19 April 2021 at 4am.

Awards and nominations
Sealed With A Kiss is nominated for two awards in Star Awards 2016. The series, along with Good Luck, is one of two Mediacorp series not to be nominated for any technical awards.

Star Awards 2016

Fame Awards 2016

See also
 List of programmes broadcast by Mediacorp Channel 8
 List of Sealed With A Kiss episodes

References

Singapore Chinese dramas
2015 Singaporean television series debuts
2015 Singaporean television series endings
Channel 8 (Singapore) original programming